Godwin Obasogie (born January 25, 1954, in Benin City, Nigeria) is a Nigerian Olympian hurdler.

Obasogie was an All-American as a freshman at the University of Missouri in 1975. As a member of the Nigerian Olympic team in 1976, he ran the 110m Hurdles.

References

Living people
1954 births
Sportspeople from Benin City
Athletes (track and field) at the 1974 British Commonwealth Games
Commonwealth Games competitors for Nigeria